Elsa Bornemann (February 20, 1952 - May 24, 2013) was an Argentine children's writer who was a doctor of the Arts, polyglot and composer. Her books have been translated into many languages, including Braille.

Biography
Elsa Bornemann was born in the Parque Patricios neighborhood of Buenos Aires to Wilhelm Karl Henri Bornemann and Blancanieves Fernández. She was a teacher, having received her degree in the University of Buenos Aires.

During the 1976-83 National Reorganization Process, her book Un elefante ocupa mucho espacio was censored and banned. The same story was featured on the Honor list of the Hans Christian Andersen Award, the first Argentine to be recognized in such a manner. Later, her books Bilembambudín o el último Mago and Disparatario were selected as part of the list "The White Ravens" awarded by the Internationale Jugendbibliothek. Some of her books like Socorro or Queridos monstruos sold more than 100 thousands copies.

Edited books
Un elefante ocupa mucho espacio
El libro de los chicos enamorados
Queridos monstruos
Los desmaravilladores
Disparatario
Los Grendelines
Sol de noche
Corazonadas
No hagan olas
¡Socorro! Doce cuentos para caerse de miedo
El último mago
Lisa de los paraguas
El niño envuelto
Mil grullas
Un amor disparatado
Cuadernos de un delfín

Awards and distinctions
Faja de Honor de la Sociedad Argentina de Escritores (1972)
San Francisco de Asís Award (1977)
"Alicia Moreau de Justo" Award (1985)
Special Mention in the National Award of Children's Literature (1986)
Honor Roll of the Hans Christian Andersen Award (1976)
Platinum Konex Award (1994)

See also

 Lists of writers

References 

1952 births
2013 deaths
Argentine children's writers
Argentine women writers
Argentine people of German descent
Argentine women children's writers
Writers from Buenos Aires